This is a list of candidates for the 2010 Victorian state election. The election was held on 27 November 2010.

Retiring MPs

Labor
 Peter Batchelor MLA (Thomastown)
 Bob Cameron MLA (Bendigo West)
 Carlo Carli MLA (Brunswick)
 Judy Maddigan MLA (Essendon)
 Karen Overington MLA (Ballarat West)
 George Seitz MLA (Keilor)

Liberal
 Helen Shardey MLA (Caulfield)
 John Vogels MLC (Western Victoria Region)

National
 Ken Jasper MLA (Murray Valley)

Legislative Assembly
Sitting members are shown in bold text. Successful candidates are highlighted in the relevant colour. Where there is possible confusion, an asterisk (*) is also used.

Legislative Council
Sitting members are shown in bold text. Tickets that elected at least one MLC are highlighted in the relevant colour. Successful candidates are identified by an asterisk (*).

Eastern Metropolitan
The Labor Party was defending two seats. The Liberal Party was defending three seats.

Eastern Victoria
The Labor Party was defending two seats. The Liberal/National Coalition was defending three seats.

Northern Metropolitan
The Labor Party was defending three seats. The Liberal Party was defending one seat. The Greens were defending one seat.

Northern Victoria
The Labor Party was defending two seats. The Liberal/National Coalition was defending three seats.

South Eastern Metropolitan
The Labor Party was defending three seats. The Liberal Party was defending two seats.

Southern Metropolitan
The Labor Party was defending two seats. The Liberal Party was defending two seats. The Greens were defending one seat.

Western Metropolitan
The Labor Party was defending three seats. The Liberal Party was defending one seat. The Greens were defending one seat.

Western Victoria
The Labor Party was defending two seats. The Liberal Party was defending two seats. The Democratic Labor Party was defending one seat.

Unregistered parties and groups
Some parties and groups that did not qualify for registration with the Victorian Electoral Commission nevertheless endorsed candidates, who appeared on the ballot papers as independent candidates.
The Australian Democrats endorsed Daniel Sapphire in Caulfield, Hayden Ostrom Brown in Gembrook, Shane McKenzie in Kilsyth, Robert Livesay in Niddrie and Alan Ide in Oakleigh.
The "Make the State Pay" group endorsed Bob Halsall in Cranbourne, Tim Hassan in Narre Warren North and Angela Dunleavy in Narre Warren South.
The Socialist Equality Party endorsed Peter Byrne in Broadmeadows.
The Secular Party of Australia endorsed John Perkins in Melbourne.
The Socialist Party endorsed Stephen Jolly in Richmond.
The "Plug the Pipe" group endorsed Jan Beer in Seymour.
The Pedestrian08 Campaign endorsed ungrouped candidate Mike Cockburn in Southern Metropolitan.
South Australian Senator Nick Xenophon endorsed Lorraine Beyer in Macedon and Stephen Mayne's Group C in Northern Metropolitan.

References
 2010 Victorian state election candidate nominations: VEC

See also
2010 Victorian state election
Members of the Victorian Legislative Assembly, 2006–2010
Members of the Victorian Legislative Council, 2006–2010
Members of the Victorian Legislative Assembly, 2010–2014
Members of the Victorian Legislative Council, 2010–2014

Victoria
Candidates for Victorian state elections